Jeanne Hardeyn (2 March 1915 in Levallois Perret - 14 February 1981 in Issy-les-Moulineaux) was a French comedian and actress.

Filmography

1915 births
1981 deaths
French comedians
French women comedians
20th-century French comedians
20th-century French women